Parachlorella is a genus of green algae in the order Chlorellales.

References

External links

Trebouxiophyceae genera
Chlorellaceae